The play-offs of the 2022 Billie Jean King Cup Americas Zone Group I were the final stages of the Group I zonal competition involving teams from the Americas. Using the positions determined in their pools, the eight teams faced off to determine their placing in the 2022 Billie Jean King Cup Americas Zone Group I. The top two teams advanced to the 2022 Billie Jean King Cup Play-offs, while the bottom two teams were relegated to Americas Zone Group II for 2023.

Pool results

Promotion play-off 
The first and second-placed teams of each pool played against one another in head-to-head rounds. The winners of each tie advanced to the 2022 Billie Jean King Cup Play-offs.

Brazil vs. Chile

Mexico vs. Argentina

Relegation play-offs 
The third and last-placed teams of each pool played against one another in head-to-head rounds. The losers of each tie were relegated to Americas Zone Group II in 2023.

Colombia vs. Paraguay

Guatemala vs. Ecuador

Final placements 

  was promoted based on ranking after Russia and Belarus were disqualified for violations of the Olympic Truce.

References

External links 
 Fed Cup website

2022 Billie Jean King Cup Americas Zone